Edward Henry Kraus (1875–1973) was a Professor of Mineralogy at the University of Michigan and also served as Dean of the Summer Session, 1915–1933, Dean of the College of Pharmacy, 1923–1933, and Dean of the College of Literature, Science and the Arts, 1933–1945.

Biography
Edward Henry Kraus was born at Syracuse, New York, on December 1, 1875. His father was John Erhardt Kraus, of German ancestry, and his mother, Rosa Kocher Kraus, was of Swiss descent. After training in the high school of  Syracuse, he entered Syracuse University, from which he was graduated as Bachelor of Science in 1896. During the following year he was a graduate student in that university and was also an assistant in chemistry  and German. He received the degree of Master of Science at the end of the  year. For two years, 1897–1899, he was  instructor in German and mineralogy at Syracuse. During 1899–1901 he studied  at the University of Munich, and at the end of the period received the degree of Doctor of Philosophy magna cum laude. His major study was mineralogy with chemistry and geology as  minors. His doctoral thesis was  entitled "Ueber einige Salze der seltenen Erden" He returned to Syracuse University for one year, first as instructor in mineralogy and then as associate professor of the same subject. During 1902–1904 he was head of the department of science in the Syracuse High School and in the  summer sessions of Syracuse University of 1903 and 1904 he was professor of chemistry and geology. Dr. Kraus was a fellow of the Geological Society of America, member of the American Chemical Society, the American Association for the Advancement of Science, and other scientific organizations. For two  years, 1903–1904, he was president of  the Onondaga Academy of Science.

In the fall of 1904 he was called to the University of Michigan as Assistant  Professor of Mineralogy, and in 1906 he became Junior Professor. In 1907 he was made Junior Professor of Mineralogy and Petrography, and Director of the Mineralogical Laboratory, and in 1908 he was granted a full  professorship in Mineralogy and Petrography. From 1908 to 1910 he was  Secretary, and since 1911 Acting Dean of the Summer Session. From 1908 to 1912 he also served as Secretary of the Graduate School. He published Essentials of Crystallography in 1906, "Descriptive Mineralogy" and, with W. F. Hunt, "Tables for the Determination of Minerals",  in 1911.  On June 24, 1902, Dean Kraus was married to Lena Margaret Hoffman, and they had one daughter, Margaret Anna, and a son, John Daniel. A son, Edward Hoffman, died.

He was father of scientist John D. Kraus. He was a friend of Samuel Goudsmit, another University of Michigan professor.

References

1875 births
1973 deaths
American mineralogists
Fellows of the Geological Society of America
University of Michigan faculty